Chai Nat is one of the central provinces (changwat) of Thailand. Neighbouring provinces are (from north clockwise) Nakhon Sawan, Sing Buri, Suphan Buri, and Uthai Thani. The town of Chai Nat is 188 km north of Bangkok.

Geography
Chai Nat is on the flat river plain of central Thailand's Chao Phraya River valley. In the south of the province the Chao Phraya Dam (formerly Chai Nat Dam) impounds the Chao Phraya River, both for flood control as well as to divert water into the country's largest irrigation system for the irrigation of rice paddies in the lower river valley. The dam, part of the Greater Chao Phraya Project, was finished in 1957 and was the first dam constructed in Thailand.

History
Chai Nat was first established during the Ayutthaya period and was used as a successful base of operations for confronting the Burmese army. As the Burmese were defeated every time, the area earned the name Chai Nat, 'place of victory'.

After World War II, when the Japanese had left, economic conditions were bad and food was in short supply. Chai Nat suffered this problem especially badly where bandits grouped up in the countryside stealing cattle and incited violence and crime.

Symbols
The provincial seal shows a dhammachakka and in the background a mountain. It refers to the Dhammachak Buddha image housed in the wihaan of Wat Dhammamoen, built on the slope of a mountain.

The provincial tree is the bael fruit tree (Aegle marmelos), and the provincial flower the Rainbow Shower tree (Cassia javanica). Bleeker's sheatfish (Phalacronotus bleekeri) is a provincial fish.

The slogan of the province is "Venerable Luang Pu Suk, renowned Chao Phraya Dam, famous bird park and tasty khao taengkwa pomelo".

Administrative divisions

Provincial government

Chai Nat is divided into eight districts (amphoes). The districts are further subdivided into 53 sub-districts (tambons) and 503 villages (mubans).

Local government
As of 26 November 2019 there are: one Chai Nat Provincial Administrative Organization - PAO and 39 municipal (thesaban) areas in the province. Chai Nat has town (thesaban mueang) status. Further 38 subdistrict  municipalities (thesaban tambon).
The non-municipal areas are administered by 20 Subdistrict Administrative Organizations - SAO (ongkan borihan suan tambon).

Places
Apart from Chao Phraya Dam, Chai Nat also has various important places such as
Chai Nat Bird Park: is the largest bird park in Chai Nat and Thailand, covering the area of 248 rai, include the largest aviary in Asia, and release the birds living in nature. Besides, there is also a public aquarium displaying freshwater fish species found in the Chao Phraya River.
Wat Pak Khlong Makham Thao: a Thai temple in Wat Sing District, next to the mouth of Khlong Makham Thao (Tha Chin River). This temple used to be the residence of Luang Pu Suk. He was a monk who was known for being a magician monk and producer of many renowned amulets. He has many disciples and most respected, one of which was a Prince Abhakara Kiartivongse, Prince of Chumphon.
Sapphaya Old Police Station: an ancient police station of the district of Sapphaya, built since the King Rama V's reign older than 100 years. The station features a single level wooden building with a hip roof and received the ASA Architectural Conservation Award in 2018.
Chai Nat Provincial Stadium, also known as Khao Plong Stadium: is a Chai Nat Provincial Stadium and the home stadium of Chainat Hornbill F.C.

Notable people

Born in Chai Nat
Pumpuang Duangjan (b. 1961–1992): Luk thung singer
Kapol Thongplub (b. 1967): DJ, TV host
Muangchai Kittikasem (b. 1968): world-class professional boxer

Human achievement index 2017

Since 2003, United Nations Development Programme (UNDP) in Thailand has tracked progress on human development at sub-national level using the Human achievement index (HAI), a composite index covering all the eight key areas of human development. National Economic and Social Development Board (NESDB) has taken over this task since 2017.

References

External links

Chainat Bird Park

Website of province (Thai only)
Chainat provincial map, coat of arms and postal stamp

 
Provinces of Thailand